Mir Yusof may refer to:
 Mir Yusof-e Olya
 Mir Yusof-e Sofla